"Grip" is a song by Norwegian EDM record production duo Seeb and English indie pop band Bastille. It was released on 6 December 2018 as the lead single from the latter's fourth mixtape, Other People's Heartache, Pt. 4 (2018). The song was written by Espen Berg, Dan Smith, Thomas Eriksen, Mark Crew, Simen Eriksrud and Joakim Haukaas.

Background
In an interview with NME, Smith said, "It was an interesting opportunity to work with an artist that we probably wouldn't and that's what makes the mixtapes what they are. My vocal, as it's completely fucked with, flies astronomically up into the air and I think I initially laughed [when I first heard it]. This is way outside of my comfort zone and that’s definitely a good thing."

Music video
A music video to accompany the release of "Grip" was first released onto YouTube on 24 January 2019 at a total length of three minutes and forty-five seconds.

Charts

Weekly charts

Year-end charts

References

2018 songs
Bastille (band) songs
Seeb (music producers) songs
Songs written by Dan Smith (singer)
Songs written by Espen Berg (musician)